Edvard Peperko (2 June 1966 – 27 June 1991) was a Slovene soldier.

Life and death 
Edvard Peperko was born in Kamnik and also lived in Domžale. He was one of the first to fall in Slovenia’s Ten-Day War of independence. He was struck in the chest on 27 June 1991 by special forces in Trzin and severely wounded. An ambulance was called from Domžale to transport Peperko, but he died during transport near the Ljubljana suburb of Šentjakob ob Savi. He left behind a wife and two children.

Distinctions and awards 
In 1992, he was posthumously awarded the Order of Freedom of the Republic of Slovenia for “exceptional merit in the defense of freedom and establishing the sovereignty of the Republic of Slovenia.”

Legacy
The Edvard Peperko Barracks in Ljubljana were named after Peperko in June 2012.

References

1966 births
1991 deaths
Slovenian soldiers
People from Kamnik
Military personnel killed in action
Ten-Day War